Grêmio Recreativo Escola de Samba Unidos do Porto da Pedra (commonly called Porto da Pedra or Unidos do Porto da Pedra) is a samba school currently headquartered in the municipality of São Gonçalo. The school was previously located in the city of Rio de Janeiro.

History 

Unidos do Porto da Pedra was originally known as Porto da Pedra Futebol Clube, having formed in the 1970s. The club's original colours were red and white. The club was formed by residents of its surrounding neighbourhood with the idea of forming a street block, that competed in 1975 and 1976.

On 8 March 1978 this carnival block was officially registered, with Harold Moreira named as president. The club's founders included José Carlos Rodrigues, José Paulo de Oliveira Chaffin, Jorair Ferreira, Jorge Brum, and Nilton Belomino Bispo.

Three years later, in 1981, the club reached the status of samba school; competing in Group B of the São Gonçalo Carnival. It came runner-up the following year. The club entered Group A, securing its first victory as samba school and ever since have abandoned the competitions and only came into its own neighborhood for many years.

For 1995, due to internal political problems in AESCRJ, LIESGA was created, that only existed for a Carnival but that modified the Groups 1, 2, 3, 4 for Groups A, B, C, D, E. in spite being correlation among such groups, the ascension and lowering ended having been respected and school that year it received an invitation Paulo de Almeida, then leader LIESGA, to adopt entity  automatically of Thursday for second division.

Starting from then, the school had a great revelation in years of 1996 and 1997 where the champions' parade arrived. However, the destruction of in Porto da Pedra came soon afterwards in 1998 with the eminent fall the access and like this being in 2000. however to the school it returned the Special in 2002.

In the years in that it was in the special, it was always among the last positions, exceptions done of 2005, when it almost arrived to the champions parade and 2011, where due to the fire in the Cidade do Samba it finished in the 8th, but 2012 in a plot objected on the yogurt, the association dug his/her descent for Série A.

Classifications

References 

Samba schools of Rio de Janeiro